La'Mical Perine (born January 30, 1998) is an American football running back for the Kansas City Chiefs of the National Football League (NFL). He played college football at Florida and was drafted by the New York Jets in the fourth round of the 2020 NFL Draft.

Early life and high school
Perine grew up in Mobile, Alabama and attended Theodore High School, where he played basketball and football. As a junior, Perine ran 1,416 yards, scored 16 touchdowns, and was named honorable mention Class 7A All-State. He rushed for 1,654 yards and 15 touchdowns in his senior year and was named first-team Class 7A All-State. Rated a three-star recruit, Perine committed to play college football at the University of Florida, turning down an offer from Alabama.

College career
Perine finished his true freshman season as Florida's second leading rusher with 421 yards on 91 carries with a touchdown while also catching nine passes for 161 yards and a touchdown. Although he entered his sophomore year as the Gators second-string running back, Perine was the team's leading rusher with 562 yards and eight touchdowns. As a junior, his first full season as Florida's starting running back, Perine rushed for 826 yards and seven touchdowns on 134 carries with 13 receptions for 170 yards and a touchdown.

In his senior season, Perine rushed for 677 yards and six touchdowns and caught 40 passes for 262 yards and five touchdowns. He was named the MVP of the 2019 Orange Bowl after rushing for a career-high 138 yards and two touchdowns on 13 carries and catching five passes for 43 yards and another touchdown in the Gators' 36–28 victory over Virginia. Perine finished his collegiate career with 2,485 yards (8th most in school history) and 22 rushing touchdowns on 493 carries and 72 receptions for 674 yards and eight touchdowns.

Professional career

New York Jets
Perine was selected by the New York Jets in the fourth round with the 120th overall pick in the 2020 NFL Draft. He made his NFL debut in Week 2 of the 2020 season against the San Francisco 49ers. He had three carries for 17 rushing yards in the 31–13 loss. Perine scored his first career touchdown on October 25, 2020, in an 18–10 loss to the Buffalo Bills. He was placed on injured reserve on November 24, 2020, with a high ankle sprain. On December 26, 2020, Perine was activated off of injured reserve. He was placed on the reserve/COVID-19 list by the team on December 30, 2020. Perine finished his rookie season with 64 carries for 232 rushing yards and two rushing touchdowns to go along with 11 receptions for 63 receiving yards in ten games. Perine was used sparingly in the 2021 season, only appearing in four games. 

On August 30, 2022, Perine was released by the Jets during final roster cuts.

Philadelphia Eagles
On September 1, 2022, Perine was signed to the Philadelphia Eagles practice squad. He was released on September 7.

Miami Dolphins
On October 18, 2022, Perine was signed to the Miami Dolphins practice squad.

Kansas City Chiefs
On January 28, 2023, Perine was signed to the Kansas City Chiefs practice squad. Perine won Super Bowl LVII when the Chiefs defeated the Philadelphia Eagles. He signed a reserve/future contract on February 15, 2023.

Personal life
Perine is a cousin of NFL running back Samaje Perine and NFL linebacker Myles Jack.

References

External links

New York Jets bio
Florida Gators bio

1998 births
Living people
Players of American football from Alabama
Sportspeople from Mobile, Alabama
American football running backs
Florida Gators football players
New York Jets players
Philadelphia Eagles players
Miami Dolphins players
Kansas City Chiefs players